New Helvetia Cemetery, initially named Sutter Fort Burying Ground, is a defunct cemetery founded in c. 1845 and closed in 1912, formerly located at northeast corner of Alhambra Boulevard and J Street (present-day 924 Alhambra Boulevard) in the East Sacramento neighborhood of Sacramento, California. It was the first cemetery in the city of Sacramento. 

The site is now Sutter Middle School, and has a historic plaque. It is listed as a California Historical Landmark (number 592), by the California Office of Historic Preservation since May 22, 1957.

History 
The cemetery was founded by Swiss pioneer John A. Sutter in c. 1845 (some sources state 1848), under the name the Sutter Fort Burying Ground (or Sutter Burying Ground), and in 1850 the name was changed to the New Helvetia Cemetery when Sutter donated the land. The name New Helvetia (or New Switzerland) was also used by Sutter for a 19th-century Alta California settlement (part of present-day East Sacramento) founded in August 1839. The earliest graves in this cemetery were shallow and marked with wooden boards. This land often flooded, so buried bodies were often moved and reinterred to Sacramento Historic City Cemetery and the records were not often kept. Adjacent to the cemetery was the New Helvetia Park picnic grounds, and Chevra Kaddisha Cemetery, the first Jewish cemetery in California was located across the street. 

In 1850, a cholera outbreak swept through the city and some 800 people were buried in a mass grave at New Helvetia Cemetery. Other people buried here included Chinese miners, indigent burials, and the people killed during the 1850 Squatters' riot. The northeast corner of the cemetery was specifically designated for Chinese burials. After 1860, the cemetery was deeded to the city. On April 29, 1861, a statue of the State of California (number CCXLIII) gave permission to disinter the early burials from this cemetery, in order to be "laid out and arranged in a proper manner". Because of the early years of flooding issues, there was continued talk of abandonment and elimination of the cemetery.  

It stopped operating as a cemetery in 1912. Some graves were relocated to East Lawn Memorial Park, and Sacramento Historic City Cemetery; the headstones had been stacked and left by the side of the street by the city, many headstones were moved to private houses and used as a building material. The Sacramento County Cemetery Advisory Commission has been working to find the old headstones from New Helvetia, as of 2016 they had recovered 72. 

By 1945, the land was used as a park. In 1956, the land was used to make way for the freeway and the creation of Sutter Middle School.

See also 

 California Historical Landmarks in Sacramento County
 List of cemeteries in California

References 

California Historical Landmarks
Cemeteries in Sacramento County, California
History of Sacramento, California
1912 disestablishments in California
John Sutter